We Will Be the World Champions is a 2015 Serbian sports drama film directed by Darko Bajić. It was one of six films shortlisted by Serbia to be their submission for the Academy Award for Best Foreign Language Film at the 88th Academy Awards, but lost out to Enclave. The film is based on the true story of the Yugoslavia national basketball team who won the 1970 FIBA World Championship.

Plot
The film tells the story of the four men who founded the Yugoslav basketball school and who significantly contributed to the development of basketball in Europe - Nebojša Popović, Borislav Stanković, Radomir Šaper and Aleksandar Nikolić. The main event is the final match of the 1970 FIBA World Championship, held in Ljubljana between the national teams of Yugoslavia and the United States.

Cast
The Four Pioneers
 Strahinja Blažić as Nebojša Popović
 Aleksandar Radojičić as Bora Stanković
 Miloš Biković as Radomir Šaper, the president of the Basketball Federation of Yugoslavia
 Marko Janketić as Aleksandar Nikolić,
Team Roster
 Sergej Trifunović as Ranko Žeravica, the head coach 
 Igor Kovač as Ratomir Tvrdić
 Jovan Belobrković as Ljubodrag Simonović
 Dražen Lakić as Vinko Jelovac
 Miodrag Radonjić as Trajko Rajković
 Toni Cahunek as Aljoša Žorga
 Stefan Kapičić as Dragan Kapičić. Kapičić plays the role of his own father.
 Jure Henigman as Ivo Daneu
 Krešimir Petar Ćosić as Krešimir Ćosić. Ćosić plays the role of his own father.
 Matko Knesaurek as Damir Šolman
 Goran Bogdan as Nikola Plećaš
 Peđa Marjanović as Dragutin Čermak
 Robert Kurbaša as Petar Skansi
Other characters
 Leon Lučev as Major Dane Štukalo
 Iva Babic as Maja Bedeković-Popović, wife of Nebojša Popović and Crvena zvezda player
 Nina Janković as Ljubica Otašević, Crvena zvezda player
 Radovan Vujović as Srđan Kalember, Crvena zvezda player
 Stevan Piale as Aleksandar Gec, Crvena zvezda player
 Nebojša Dugalić as Vladimir Dedijer
 Jasa Jamnik as Stane Dolanc
 Miša Nestorović as Aristotle Onassis
 Dejan Denić as Radivoj Korać
 Boban Marjanović as Jānis Krūmiņš (uncredited cameo)
 Lazar Ristovski as Tito
 John Savage as William Jones, the Secretary General of the FIBA.

References

External links
 

2015 films
2015 drama films
2010s sports drama films
2010s Serbian-language films
Basketball films
Films set in Yugoslavia
Films set in Serbia
Films set in Ljubljana
Cultural depictions of Aristotle Onassis
Films about Josip Broz Tito
Serbian sports drama films
Cultural depictions of Serbian men
Films shot in Serbia